The South Korea Men's National Wheelchair Basketball Team is the wheelchair basketball side that represents South Korea in international competitions for men as part of the International Wheelchair Basketball Federation.

Current roster
The team's current roster for the 2018 Wheelchair Basketball World Championship is:

Head coach:Sa HyunAssistant coach: Young Moo

Competitions

Wheelchair Basketball World Championship

Summer Paralympics

References

National men's wheelchair basketball teams
Wheelchair basketball